The Denver-class cruisers were a group of six protected cruisers in service with the United States Navy from 1903 through 1929. Authorized by Congress in 1899 as part of the naval buildup touched off by the Spanish–American War, they were designed with peacetime duties on foreign stations and tropical service in mind, specifically patrolling Latin America and the Caribbean. However, they had insufficient armament, armor, and speed for combat with most other cruisers. Thus, they were also called "peace cruisers" and were effectively gunboats.

Design and construction

Armament

The as-built main armament was ten /50 caliber Mark 5 rapid firing (RF) guns, arranged one each fore and aft and the remainder in casemates along the sides; the hull was cut away to allow ahead and astern fire from the end casemates. Secondary armament was six 6-pounder RF guns, two 1-pounder RF guns, and four .30 caliber (7.62 mm) machine guns, possibly the M1895 Colt–Browning machine gun.

Armor

Armor protection was very light. The 5-inch gun casemates had  armor.

Engineering

The low design speed relegated these ships to the gunboat role or commerce raiding against slower merchant ships.

Refits

By 1918 the forwardmost casemated pair of 5-inch guns had been removed for a total of eight. By 1921 a 3"/50 caliber (76 mm) anti-aircraft gun was added. The 6-pounders remained at this time; the 1-pounders and the machine guns had probably been removed.

Service

Most of the class served in Latin America and the Caribbean on missions ranging from protection of American citizens and interests, disaster relief, and diplomatic negotiations to military intervention. Galveston and Chattanooga served primarily on the Asiatic Station based in the Philippines until World War I, when they were convoy escorts. Shortly after the war Galveston and Des Moines served in the North Russia Intervention, and Galveston patrolled the Caribbean 1924–30.

In January 1924 Tacoma grounded and was lost at Blanquilla Reef near Veracruz, Mexico.

Two of the class were decommissioned in 1921, with the rest decommissioned by early 1931. All were scrapped by late 1933 to comply with the limits of the Washington and London Naval Treaties.

Legacy

Chattanoogas bell was at a now-closed American Legion post in Shelbyville, Tennessee from the 1930s until the 2010s. In late 2015 was at the National Medal of Honor Museum in the Northgate Mall, and soon will be incorporated into a memorial to the victims of the attack on the recruiting station at Chattanooga, Tennessee.

The original ship's bell from the USS Tacoma (C-18), is currently on display at the War Memorial Park in Tacoma, WA.

Ships in class

The six ships of the Denver class were:

Construction of Chattanooga was halted on 18 June 1903 when Crescent went out of business; she was completed at the Brooklyn Navy Yard. Galveston's construction was similarly halted on 24 December 1902 with the closure of Trigg; she was completed at the Norfolk Navy Yard.

The Denver-class ships were reclassified with new hull numbers in 1920 as gunboats (PG). They were further reclassified in 1921 as light cruisers (CL) as follows:

See also
 List of cruisers of the United States Navy

References

Bibliography

External links

Cruiser photo gallery index at NavSource Naval History

Cruiser classes